The Murder Capital is an Irish post-punk band that formed in Dublin in 2018. The band's music has been described as dark, intense, and introspective, with a focus on themes of vulnerability, self-reflection, and emotional turmoil. The band members are James McGovern (vocals), Damien Tuit (guitar), Cathal Roper (guitar), Gabriel Paschal Blake (bass), and Diarmuid Brennan (drums).

History 
The band began performing together in 2017, and set up their own label Human Season Records in 2018 before releasing their first singles in 2019.

On 16 August 2019, The Murder Capital released their debut studio album, When I Have Fears, which was produced by Flood and was met with widespread critical acclaim. In autumn 2019 the band performed a sold-out tour across the UK and Europe in promotion of the album.

Style 
The band has been actively compared to several post-punk and art punk bands to arise out of the United Kingdom over the late 2010s, such as Idles, Soft Play (formerly known as Slaves), Shame, and fellow Irish band Fontaines D.C., primarily as a result of touring with these bands.

Writing for The Guardian, Damien Morris described the band as "reaching back to Joy Division’s drum tattoos, interlocking with surging, wave-break bass. Pixies' quiet-loud-quiet trick is in there, as are Shame and Savages, while PJ Harvey and the Bad Seeds infest tracks such as Green and Blue."

In describing the themes of their music, the band told DIY magazine expressed visceral animation eager for improvement in their home town: "It just feels like there are loads of fuckin' hotels going up over Dublin, where there could be new housing," James hammers home. "There are cranes all over the city. There's one on George's Street right now, and they're gutting this beautiful Georgian house, and I stopped and asked the builder what it was gonna be, and it's turning into a fuckin' Premier Inn." The band further said, "the hotels are only a sidenote to the homelessness, the suicide, the mental health issues. The lack of services available to people who aren't from even middle class backgrounds," he continues. "We just wanna talk about it as much as possible, and make sure that the government knows that we're not happy with the standard of where it's at. People have real issues in their lives, and they need somewhere to go and talk about these things beyond their friends and families. It feels like there's no excuses. I know bad things that have happened to people that were avoidable."

Members 
 James McGovern – vocals
 Damien Tuit – guitars
 Cathal Roper – guitars
 Gabriel Paschal Blake – bass
 Diarmuid Brennan – drums

Discography

Studio albums

Singles

References

External links 

Irish rock music groups
Musical groups established in 2015
Musical groups from Dublin (city)
2015 establishments in Ireland